The Weiss WM-16 Budapest was a reconnaissance/bomber aircraft developed by the Manfred Weiss company in 1933.

It was developed from the Fokker C.V, of which 76 served in the Hungarian Air Force. Two major versions were built: The WM-16A, which used a 410 kW (550 hp) Gnome-Rhône 9K Mistral (9 built) and the WM-16B, which used a 641.3 kW (860 hp) Gnome-Rhône 14K Mistral Major (9 built). The WM-16A was considered to be unsuitable for operational service, so the WM-16B was developed as a bomber instead of a reconnaissance aircraft. The WM-16 was used as the basis for the Weiss WM-21 Sólyom. Aircraft were built at the Manfréd Weiss Steel and Metal Works in Csepel, the MÁVAG factory in Budapest, and by the Rába (company) in Győr. Starting in 1941 these aircraft were relegated to secondary duties.

Specifications
WM-16A
Range = 800 km
Maximum speed = 215 km/h
Ceiling height = 6,800 m
Crew = 2

WM-16B
Length = 9.55 m
Wingspan = 15.3 m
Maximum speed = 300 km/h
Empty weight = 2,150 kg
Primary Armament = 3 x 7.92 mm Gebauer 1934.M GKM air-cooled machine guns (chambered in 7.92×57mm Mauser)
Payload = 300 kg of bombs
Crew = 2

See also

References

Fokker aircraft
Reconnaissance aircraft
Bomber aircraft
Biplanes
Single-engined tractor aircraft
Weiss Manfred aircraft